Labrus is a genus of wrasses native to the eastern Atlantic Ocean into the Mediterranean and Black seas.

Species
The four currently recognized species in this genus are:
 Labrus bergylta Ascanius, 1767 (Ballan wrasse)
 Labrus merula Linnaeus, 1758 (brown wrasse)
 Labrus mixtus Linnaeus, 1758 (cuckoo wrasse)
 Labrus viridis Linnaeus, 1758 (green wrasse)

Fossil record

Fossils of Labrus are found from the Eocene to the Quaternary (age range: from 55.8 to 0.781 million years ago.).  They are known from various localities of France, Italy and the United Kingdom.

References

 
Labridae
 
 
 
 
 
Marine fish genera
Taxa named by Carl Linnaeus